Gess is a board game.

GESS or Gess may also refer to:

People 
 Edgar Gess (born 1954), Russian-German football coach and former player
 Robert Gess (born 1985), German judo player
 Germain Henri Hess or German Ivanovich Gess (1802–1850), Swiss-Russian chemist and doctor

Schools 
 Gan Eng Seng School, a school in Singapore
 German European School Singapore, a co-education school in Singapore

See also 
 Guess (disambiguation)